Van Straten  is a Dutch toponymic surname meaning "from/of Straten". Literally translated as "streets", there are a number of settlements in the Low Countries with that name, including  near Oirschot in North Brabant. Notable people with the surname include:

Florence van Straten (1913–1992), American aerological engineer 
Frank van Straten (born 1936), Australian historian
Giorgio van Straten (born 1955), Italian writer
 (1892-1944), Belgian lithographer
Kristin Bauer van Straten (born 1966), American actress
 (1897–1968), Dutch major general who defended Timor in World War II
Rocco van Straten (born 1991), Dutch snowboarder

See also
12708 Van Straten, main-belt asteroid named after Henri Van Straten 
Van Straaten, variant spelling of the surname

References

Dutch-language surnames
Toponymic surnames
Surnames of Dutch origin